The Christmas thrush (Turdus poliocephalus erythropleurus) is a subspecies of the island thrush (Turdus poliocephalus). It is endemic to Christmas Island, an Australian territory in the Indian Ocean.

Description
The Christmas thrush has a mainly dark grey-brown head, paler grey-brown throat and upper breast, with olive-brown upperparts. The flanks, lower breast and sides of belly are orange, with a white belly and vent. It is about 21 cm in length, with a wingspan of 34 cm and a weight of 55 g. Its bill, orbital ring and legs are yellow-orange. Males and females are similar in size and appearance.

Distribution and habitat
The subspecies is now limited to Christmas Island. Between 1885 and 1900 it was introduced to the Cocos (Keeling) Islands, where it was plentiful for many years on three islands of the main atoll as well as on North Keeling. However, between the 1940s and 1980s population reduced until becoming extirpated. It is commonly found in most habitats on Christmas Island, including rainforest and gardens. It is less common in Pandanus thickets, dense regrowth and post-mining wasteland.

Behaviour

Breeding
The thrush breeds mainly from early October until the middle of March, though there are records from other months. It nests in trees and tree ferns, and sometimes on the ledges of buildings. The clutch size is usually 2–3, and the incubation period is 18 days, with fledging in 17–19 days. Several broods may be raised in a season.

Feeding
It forages mainly on the ground, in leaf litter in the forest and forest clearings, as well as on lawns, for small invertebrates, including insects, snails and earthworms, seeds and fallen fruit.

Status and conservation
In 2000 the population of the Christmas thrush was estimated to comprise some 4000 birds. The main threat to the subspecies, as well as to other Christmas Island endemic birds, is predation of its nestlings by introduced yellow crazy ants. It was listed by the Australian Government as being Critically Endangered, now Endangered.

Notes

References
 Garnett, Stephen T.; & Crowley, Gabriel M. (2000). The Action Plan for Australian Birds 2000. Environment Australia: Canberra.  
 Higgins, P.J.; Peter, J.M.; & Cowling, S.J. (eds). 2006. Handbook of Australian, New Zealand and Antarctic Birds. Volume 7: Boatbill to Starlings. Oxford University Press: Melbourne. 

Christmas thrush
Birds of Christmas Island
Christmas thrush
Subspecies